Cherrill is a surname in the English language.

Nelson King Cherrill, New Zealand 19th-century photographer
David Cherrill, American television writer and director
Virginia Cherrill, American film actress

References

English-language surnames